Dexter McCoil Sr. (born September 5, 1991) is a gridiron football coach and former safety, who is the current safeties coach for the Texas State Bobcats. He played college football at Tulsa. McCoil played professionally for the Los Angeles Kiss, Edmonton Eskimos, Los Angeles Chargers, San Francisco 49ers, Calgary Stampeders, St. Louis BattleHawks and Toronto Argonauts.

Early years
McCoil attended Lutcher High School in Lutcher, Louisiana, where he helped lead the Bulldogs to the 2008 3A State Championship. He was ranked as the 58th top prospect in the state of Louisiana by Rivals.com.  He was named the District MVP following his senior season. He was an honorable mention all-state in his senior season. McCoil also earned the all-district, all-metro and all-River Parish honors following both his junior and senior seasons of high school.

College career
McCoil was named the Defensive MVP following his performance in the 2011 Bell Helicopter Armed Forces Bowl. He also earned second-team all-Conference USA honors following his junior season. Prior to his senior season, he was selected on the Bronko Nagurski Trophy Watch List and also selected on the Jim Thorpe Award Watch List. In his four seasons at Tulsa, he finished with a total of 315 tackles, 18 Interceptions, 43 passes defensed, and one forced fumble.

Professional career
McCoil went undrafted following the conclusion of the 2013 NFL Draft. McCoil attended the Oakland Raiders rookie minicamp but failed to make the final cut on the preseason 90 man roster.

Los Angeles Kiss
On February 17, 2014, McCoil was assigned to the Los Angeles Kiss of the Arena Football League (AFL). In 5 games for the Kiss, McCoil managed several splash plays, including half a sack, and an interception returned 14 yards for a touchdown.

Edmonton Eskimos
On May 31, 2014, he signed with the Edmonton Eskimos of the Canadian Football League. He won the CFL's Most Outstanding Rookie Award in 2014 for recording 67 tackles, four sacks and tying for the league lead with six interceptions. McCoil and the Eskimos had a contract dispute during the 2015 CFL season as he claimed that he was not offered the 1-year contract (with a player option to extend to 2 years), rather he claimed the Eskimos only offered him the minimum 2-year contract. On the field McCoil continued to be a key cog in the Eskimos defense recording 76 defensive tackles, two sacks, three interceptions and a fumble recovery. On December 6, 2015, after winning the 103rd Grey Cup to close the season, the Eskimos announced they had reached a settlement of all outstanding matters with Dexter McCoil, the CFL and the CFLPA. Starting on May 1, 2016, McCoil was free to attempt to sign with an NFL team. In the event that McCoil was unsuccessful in securing an NFL standard player contract for the 2016 NFL season, he entered into an agreement to play for the Eskimos for the 2016 and 2017 CFL seasons.

San Diego / Los Angeles Chargers

On January 12, 2016, he signed with the San Diego Chargers. The Chargers tried him out at linebacker and at safety during their off-season workouts. On September 3, 2016, he was listed on the Chargers' final 53-man roster. McCoil made his first start at safety for the Chargers on September 25, 2016, against the Indianapolis Colts. He played in all 16 games with two starts, recording 25 tackles, five passes defensed and one interception. On October 7, 2017, McCoil was waived by the Chargers.

San Francisco 49ers
On October 9, 2017, McCoil was claimed off waivers by the San Francisco 49ers. He was released on April 30, 2018. He was re-signed by the 49ers on August 17, 2018. He was waived on September 1, 2018. He was re-signed again to the practice squad on September 27, 2018. He was released on October 9, 2018.

Los Angeles Chargers (II)
On January 2, 2019, McCoil was signed to the Los Angeles Chargers practice squad.

Calgary Stampeders 
On October 22, 2019 McCoil returned to the CFL, signing with the Calgary Stampeders near the end of the 2019 regular season. In two games played, McCoil managed 2 tackles on defense, 3 more on special teams, and an interception. Following Calgary's playoff defeat, during which McCoil put up 4 more defensive tackles and two more special teams stops, he was cut on November 25, 2019.

St. Louis BattleHawks 
On October 16, 2019, several days prior to signing with the Stampeders, McCoil was drafted by the St. Louis BattleHawks in the fourth round of the defensive backs phase of the 2020 XFL Draft. In 5 games played, McCoil finished tied for 3rd in the league in tackles (alongside several other players including teammate Terence Garvin) with 36, in addition to a quarterback sack. He had his contract terminated when the league suspended operations on April 10, 2020.

Toronto Argonauts 
On June 28, 2021, McCoil signed with the Toronto Argonauts of the Canadian Football League.

Personal life
His second cousin is former cornerback Corey Webster.

References

External links
 Tulsa Golden Hurricane bio
 Edmonton Eskimos bio 
 Los Angeles Chargers bio

1991 births
Living people
People from Metairie, Louisiana
Players of American football from Louisiana
American football safeties
Tulsa Golden Hurricane football players
Canadian Football League Rookie of the Year Award winners
Edmonton Elks players
Incarnate Word Cardinals football coaches
Los Angeles Kiss players
San Diego Chargers players
Los Angeles Chargers players
San Francisco 49ers players
Calgary Stampeders players
Canadian football linebackers
St. Louis BattleHawks players
Toronto Argonauts players
Texas State Bobcats football coaches